The Breitung Hotel, named for Edward Breitung, was a hotel at 111 South Pioneer Avenue in Negaunee, Michigan. The hotel, designed by David M. Harteau, was built from 1879 to 1880. The building was listed as a Michigan State Historic Site on June 20, 1985.

The hotel was destroyed in a fire. The park at the site of hotel was named Breitung Park in August 2009 in its honor.

Architecture
The Breitung was a three-story, L-shaped Italian Renaissance building. The facade was cream-colored brick with brownstone trim and stone quoining. The front of the building possessed a four-story, square tower topped by a mansard roof with an iron balcony on the third floor. A Late Victorian veranda stretched across the front the building.

See also
List of Michigan State Historic Sites in Marquette County, Michigan

References

Demolished hotels in the United States
Buildings and structures in Marquette County, Michigan
Michigan State Historic Sites
Hotel buildings completed in 1880
1880 establishments in Michigan